PAVE is a United States Air Force program identifier relating to electronic systems. Prior to 1979, Pave was said to be a code word for the Air Force unit responsible for the project. Pave was used as an inconsequential prefix identifier for a wide range of different programs, though backronyms and alternative meanings have been used. For example, in the helicopters Pave Low and Pave Hawk it was said to mean Precision Avionics Vectoring Equipment, but in Pave Paws it was said to mean Precision Acquisition Vehicle Entry.

PAVE systems 
 Pave Eagle – Modified Beechcraft Bonanza drone aircraft for low altitude sensor monitoring.
 Pave Hawk – Sikorsky HH-60 Pave Hawk special operations and combat search and rescue helicopter.
 Pave Nail - OV-10 Bronco with Pave Spot target laser designator pod.
 Pave Knife – Ford Aerospace AN/AVQ-10 Pave Knife early laser targeting pod.
 Pave Low – Sikorsky MH-53 Pave Low special ops and combat search and rescue helicopter.
 Pave Mint – Upgrade of the AN/ALQ-117 electronic warfare system to the AN/ALQ-172.
 Pave Mover – Demonstration program to develop the AN/APY-7 radar wide-area surveillance, ground moving target indicator (GMTI), fixed target indicator (FTI) target classification, and synthetic aperture radar (SAR), for the E-8 Joint STARS.
 Pave Onyx – Vietnam era Advanced Location Strike System c.1973.
 Pave Pace – A fully integrated avionics architecture featuring functional resource allocation.
 PAVE PAWS – The Phased-Array Warning System which replaced the three BMEWS radars. Pave in this case is a backronym for Perimeter or Precision Acquisition Vehicle Entry.
 Pave Penny – Lockheed-Martin AN/AAS-35(V) laser spot tracker.
 Pave Pillar – Generic core avionics architecture system for combat aircraft.
 Pave Pronto – Lockheed AC-130 Spectre gunship program.
 Pave Spectre – Lockheed AC-130E gunships.
 Pave Spike – Westinghouse AN/ASQ-153\AN/AVQ-23 electro-optical laser designator pod.
 Pave Sword – AN/AVQ-11 Pave Sword laser tracker.
 Pave Tack – Ford Aerospace AN/AVQ-26 electro-optical targeting pod. Used first on F-4 and then later on F-111F model aircraft.
 Paveway – A family of laser-guided bomb conversion kits, to be fitted to standard unguided bombs.
Pave COIN/Project Little Brother - A USAF program evaluating counter insurgency aircraft during the early 1970s.

See also 
 Light Airborne Multi-Purpose System (LAMPS)

References

Notes

Bibliography 

  - Contains a list of PAVE program names relating to Laser Guided bombs
 

Equipment of the United States Air Force